Kelly Edward Pratt (born February 8, 1953) is a Canadian former professional ice hockey winger who played 22 games in the National Hockey League and 46 games in the World Hockey Association. He played with the Winnipeg Jets and Pittsburgh Penguins.

External link

1953 births
Canadian ice hockey right wingers
Hampton Gulls (AHL) players
Hershey Bears players
Jacksonville Barons players
Living people
People from Big Lakes County
Pittsburgh Penguins players
San Diego Mariners (PHL) players
Swift Current Broncos players
Undrafted National Hockey League players
Winnipeg Jets (WHA) draft picks
Winnipeg Jets (WHA) players

References